John Butcher may refer to:

John Butcher (musician) (born 1954), British saxophonist
John Butcher (Australian footballer) (born 1991), Australian rules footballer with the Port Adelaide Football Club
John Butcher, 1st Baron Danesfort (1853–1935), British lawyer
John C. Butcher (born 1933), New Zealand mathematician
John Butcher (British politician) (1946–2006), Conservative MP for Coventry South-West 1979–1997
John Butcher (baseball) (born 1957), former Major League Baseball player
John Butcher (English footballer) (born 1956), English association football goalkeeper who played for Blackburn

See also
Jon Butcher (born 1955), American singer and guitarist
Butcher (surname)